Poikkal Kudhirai is a 1983 Indian Tamil-language comedy film directed by K. Balachander and produced by Kalaivani. The film was the Tamil debut of the lead  actor Ramakrishna. Lyricist Vaali also made his acting debut through this film. Kamal Haasan appeared in a guest role. Poikkal Kudhirai was based on Crazy Mohan's play Marriage Made in Saloon. The film was an average success.

Plot 

Poikkal Kuthirai is a hilarious depiction of how Sambandam — who bets on each and every small thing and wins — and Indu enter into a bet at a saloon owned by Muthu. The bet is that Indu will win Sambadam's daughter Janaki's heart and marry her. If Indhu is successful in his mission, Sambandam will shave half of his moustache for their marriage. If he fails, Indhu will shave his head. Who wins the bet is the film's narrative.

Cast 
 Ramakrishna as Indhu
 Viji as Janaki
 Raveendran as Muthu
 Vaali as Sambandham
 Charle as Paramasivam
 Radha Ravi as Nair
Pavithra as Stella
 Kamal Haasan as himself acted inside photo frame (guest appearance)
 Suhasini Maniratnam (Guest appearance)
Vanitha (Guest appearance)
Kuyili (Uncredited)
Kavithalaya Krishnan as Munsami
Mohan as Mohan
Oru Viral Krishna Rao as Doctor
K. S. Jayalakshmi

Production 
Poikkal Kudhirai is based on Crazy Mohan's play Marriage Made in Saloon. Kannada actor Ramakrishna and lyricist Vaali made their acting debut in Tamil with this film. Mohan wrote the dialogues, making his feature film debut.

Soundtrack 
Soundtrack was composed by M. S. Viswanathan and lyrics were written by Vaali.

References

External links 
 

1980s Tamil-language films
1983 films
1983 romantic comedy films
Films directed by K. Balachander
Films scored by M. S. Viswanathan
Films with screenplays by K. Balachander
Indian films based on plays
Indian romantic comedy films